Thiemo Storz (born 12 October 1991 in Tettnang) is a racing driver from Germany.

Career

Formula Renault 2.0
After ten years in karting, Storz stepped up to single-seaters in 2008, making his debut in the Formula Renault 2.0 Italia Winter Cup. After finishing seventh in his first category, he  also participated in Formula 2000 Light Italy Winter and main series, with fourth and fourteenth place respectively.

Storz remained in Formula 2000 Light Italy for 2009, also taking part in LO Formula Renault 2.0 Suisse and in Hungaroring round of the Formula Renault 2.0 Italia.

Formula Palmer Audi
Storz missed almost entire 2010 season due to academic reasons, but he appeared at Rockingham Motor Speedway, racing in Formula Palmer Audi.

FIA Formula Two Championship
After testing at the end of 2010 in Portimao and Barcelona, Storz made his FIA Formula Two Championship debut in 2011.

Racing record

Career summary

Complete FIA Formula Two Championship results
(key) (Races in bold indicate pole position) (Races in italics indicate fastest lap)

References

External links
Official website

1991 births
Living people
German racing drivers
Italian Formula Renault 2.0 drivers
Formula Renault 2.0 Alps drivers
Formula Palmer Audi drivers
FIA Formula Two Championship drivers
People from Bodenseekreis
Sportspeople from Tübingen (region)
Racing drivers from Baden-Württemberg